The 1892 Notre Dame football team was an American football team that represented the University of Notre Dame in the 1892 college football season. Milestones for the season included the first 50-point game in ND history, and the first tie.

Schedule

The contest against South Bend High School on October 19 was not considered a Varsity match.  The game was played by the Notre Dame secondary, also known as the anti-specials team.  A varsity team would not be established for several weeks.

References

Notre Dame
Notre Dame Fighting Irish football seasons
Notre Dame football